William Rostron Duckworth (24 November 1879 – 14 July 1952) was a British Conservative Party politician. He was the Member of Parliament (MP) for Manchester Moss Side from 1935 to 1945.

References

External links 
 

1879 births
1952 deaths
UK MPs 1935–1945
Conservative Party (UK) MPs for English constituencies